The 2017 NBA Finals was the championship series of the National Basketball Association's (NBA) 2016–17 season and conclusion of the season's playoffs. The Western Conference champion Golden State Warriors defeated the defending NBA champion and Eastern Conference champion Cleveland Cavaliers four games to one. This Finals was the first time in NBA history the same two teams had met for a third consecutive year. The Cavaliers sought to repeat as champions after winning the championship in 2016, while the Warriors won their first meeting in 2015. The Warriors entered the 2017 Finals after becoming the first team in NBA playoff history to start , while the Cavaliers entered the 2017 Finals with a  record during the first three rounds of the postseason. The Warriors'  start in the playoffs is the most consecutive postseason wins in NBA history and their  record is the best winning percentage in NBA playoff history. Golden State's Kevin Durant was named the Finals Most Valuable Player (MVP). Durant won the Finals MVP award unanimously, receiving all 11 Finals MVP votes.

Background

Golden State Warriors

This was the Golden State Warriors' third consecutive trip to the NBA Finals and ninth appearance overall, having come short of back-to-back titles in the 2016 NBA Finals by losing in seven games after having a 3–1 lead. With the acquisition of free agent Kevin Durant in the offseason, the Warriors were hailed as a "Superteam" by the media and fans, forming a new All-Star "Big Four" of Durant, Stephen Curry, Klay Thompson and Draymond Green.

The team equaled their 2014–15 regular-season record of 67–15, their second most wins in franchise history. They won the Pacific Division title and Western Conference Championship for the third consecutive season. The club became the fastest team in NBA history to clinch a playoff berth, achieving the feat on February 25, 2017, two days earlier than last season when they clinched on February 27, 2016. They also became the first team in NBA playoff history to start 12–0, sweeping the Portland Trail Blazers in the first round, the Utah Jazz in the Western Conference semifinals, and the San Antonio Spurs in the Western Conference Finals. Entering the Finals, this twelve game win-streak tied third for the most consecutive wins in the postseason. The Warriors also entered the Finals with the largest playoff points differential in NBA history, with a +16.3 winning margin per game.

Cleveland Cavaliers

This was the Cleveland Cavaliers' third consecutive trip to the NBA Finals, and fourth appearance overall, seeking to repeat as NBA champions. This was also the seventh consecutive NBA Finals appearance for LeBron James, and the sixth for James Jones (who technically qualified for the 2011 NBA Finals along with James, but did not play).

The Cavaliers finished the 2016–17 regular season with a 51–31 record, securing the 2nd seed in the Eastern Conference. In the playoffs, the Cavaliers swept the Indiana Pacers in the first round, swept the Toronto Raptors in the Eastern Conference semifinals, and defeated the Boston Celtics in five games in the Eastern Conference Finals.

Road to the Finals

Regular season series
The Warriors and Cavaliers tied the regular season series 1–1, with each team winning its home game.

Series summary

Game summaries
All times are in Eastern Daylight Time (UTC−4)

Game 1

The Warriors routed the Cavaliers 113–91 to take a 1–0 series lead. The Warriors led by only 8 points at halftime, but they opened the third quarter on a 13–0 run and never looked back. Kevin Durant had 38 points to lead the Warriors, and Stephen Curry added 28 points. The Cavaliers' LeBron James also had 28 points, becoming the first player to score 6000 career points in the postseason. James also passed Reggie Miller for second all-time in postseason three-pointers made. He grabbed 15 rebounds and dished out 8 assists, but he committed 8 of the Cavaliers' 20 turnovers. Golden State as a team managed only half of James' total with 4 turnovers, equaling the NBA record for fewest turnovers in an NBA Finals game. With this win, the Warriors became the first team ever to start 13–0 in the playoffs and their current 13 game win-streak is tied for the most consecutive postseason wins in NBA history. Former Cavaliers head coach and current Warriors interim head coach Mike Brown took charge of the game, with Steve Kerr still being out due to illness.

The Cavaliers became the first team in NBA Finals history to fail to record a steal in a game. With the loss, the Cavaliers' nine game road playoff winning streak (a streak that began when they won Game 5 of the 2016 NBA Finals) came to an end. James dropped to 1–7 in NBA Finals openers in his career.

Game 2

The Warriors won Game 2 over the Cavaliers, 132–113, to improve their best start in NBA playoff history to 14–0. Their fourteen-game win-streak is the longest postseason win streak in NBA history. Golden State surpassed Cleveland's thirteen game win-streak, which dated back to Game 5 of the 2016 Finals. The Warriors also hit an NBA Finals record 18 three-pointers on 43 attempts, with Stephen Curry, Klay Thompson, and Kevin Durant hitting four threes apiece and Draymond Green connecting on a three of his own from behind the arc. Warriors Coach Steve Kerr returned from illness to coach from the sideline for the first time since April 19, 2017. In what was a high scoring affair for both teams, the Warriors held a slim three-point lead (67–64) at halftime and a four-point lead (86–82) past the midway point of the third quarter before outscoring the Cavs 35–17 through the middle of the fourth quarter. LeBron James led the Cavaliers with 29 points while grabbing 11 rebounds and dishing out 14 assists, and Kevin Love and Kyrie Irving added 27 and 19 points, respectively.

For the Warriors, Durant scored 33 points with 13 rebounds, while Curry had 32 points to go along with 10 rebounds and 11 assists. With his eighth triple-double of the Finals, James moved into a tie with Magic Johnson for the most Finals triple-doubles in the league. Game 2 was the first postseason game since 1970 where two opposing players each had a triple-double. Golden State took a 2–0 series lead heading into Cleveland for Game 3.

Game 3

The Warriors defeated the Cavaliers 118–113 to extend the longest winning streak in NBA playoff history to 15 games. Golden State became the first team in the four major sports leagues in North America to go 15–0 in the postseason. The Warriors got off to a blistering start, hitting an NBA Finals record 9 three-pointers in the first quarter, resulting in an early 39-32 lead. During the quarter, the Cavaliers got a scare when LeBron James bumped into his teammate Tristan Thompson trying to guard Klay Thompson, but James stayed in the game. The Warriors finished the first half with 12 made three-pointers, another NBA Finals record for most threes in a half, and led 67–61. However, the Cavaliers started to show some life to start the third quarter, going on a 10–2 run to lead 71–69. They led 94–89 after three quarters of play and 113–107 with 2:32 remaining in the fourth quarter, but the Warriors scored 11 unanswered points to steal the road win and take a commanding 3–0 series lead heading into Game 4. During the game-ending run, Kevin Durant drilled the go-ahead three-pointer for Golden State with 45.3 seconds remaining and Iguodala blocked LeBron James' potential game-tying 3.

Durant led the Warriors with 31 points, going 4-for-7 from behind the arc that included the winning basket. Klay Thompson added 30 points on 6-of-11 shooting from three-point range, and Stephen Curry scored 26 points on 5-of-9 shooting from downtown to go along with 13 rebounds. For the Cavaliers, James had 39 points, falling one assist shy of a triple-double with 11 rebounds and 9 assists. Kyrie Irving added 38 points but struggled from beyond the arc, going 0-for-7. Despite stellar performances from both James and Irving, Cleveland finished the game a dismal 12-of-44 from three-point range, compared to the Warriors 16-of-33 performance on three point shots.

Game 4

The Cleveland Cavaliers led wire-to-wire as they avoided a Finals sweep by Golden State to rout the Warriors 137–116, ending Golden State's NBA postseason record winning streak at 15 games to start the 2017 playoffs. The game was notable for shattering a number of NBA Finals records. The Cavs scored 49 points in the first quarter, the most points of any period in a Finals game, en route to scoring 86 points for the first half, which was the most points scored in a half. They also hit 13 three-pointers in the first half, which broke the Finals record for most threes in a half set last game by the Warriors. The Cavaliers finished the game with 24 three-pointers, which easily broke the Finals record for the most threes in a game set by the Warriors in Game 2. Both the Cavaliers and Warriors combined to score a total of 154 points in the first half, which is another Finals record for most points by any two teams in a half.	

LeBron James tallied his ninth triple-double of the Finals (31 points, 10 rebounds, 11 assists), surpassing Magic Johnson for the most triple-doubles in a championship series. His highlight of the game came three minutes into the third quarter when he threw a pass off the backboard to himself, finishing with a powerful dunk. James also passed Michael Jordan for third all-time in points scored in the Finals. Kyrie Irving led all scorers with 40 points, breaking out of a shooting slump from behind the arc by going 7-for-12. Kevin Love added 23 points on 6-of-8 from downtown, and J. R. Smith had 15 points, all on 5-of-9 from three-point range, including a deep shot from 30 feet in the second quarter to beat the shot clock buzzer. Kevin Durant scored 35 points to lead the Warriors, but their other three superstars were held to under 20 points each as Stephen Curry, Klay Thompson, and Draymond Green managed 14, 13, and 16 points respectively. Cleveland trails the Finals, 3–1, as the series shifts back to Oakland.	

Game 4 was also notable for a number of testy incidents. As the teams prepared for a jump ball with 1:56 left in the first quarter, Green was called for a hard foul for throwing an elbow at Iman Shumpert. Green was trying to plead his case when Warriors head coach Steve Kerr simultaneously argued with the officials, who then called a technical foul on Kerr, although it was mistakenly recorded as a foul on Green. With 7:26 remaining in the third quarter, Love fouled Durant from behind on a layup attempt. Durant claimed he was hit hard in the forehead, and James exchanged words with him, leading to a double-technical on the pair as well as a type 1 flagrant foul on Kevin Love. About a minute later, Green picked up what appeared to be his second technical foul of the game, which would have forced an ejection. However, the officials confirmed that the first technical was on coach Kerr, not Green as originally recorded. Late in the third, Shumpert and Zaza Pachulia got involved in a mini scuffle when battling for the loose ball, with Pachulia hitting in the direction of Shumpert's groin and Shumpert retaliating. At the same time, a Cavaliers fan, charged onto the court to shout at Matt Barnes during the Warriors huddle as the officials were replaying the incident. Shumpert and Pachulia were assessed double technicals, and the fan was escorted out of the arena by security personnel.

Many in the media and on Twitter commented on the refereeing in this game, calling it "a disaster" and "a sideshow".

Game 5

The Warriors defeated the Cavaliers with a score of 129–120 to win the series 4–1. With this win, the Warriors 16–1 postseason record is the best winning percentage in NBA playoffs history. LeBron James and Kyrie Irving tried their best to combat the Warriors offense but were unable to overcome a bad night from Kevin Love, who only had six points and a game low minus-21 in his 29 minutes, and the Cavaliers bench, which was outscored 7 to 35 by the Warriors' bench. The Cavaliers did come out aggressive early while Golden State dealt with a series of turnovers. Though the Warriors trailed 41-33 with 10:14 left in the second quarter, they chipped away at that deficit and eventually were able to take a 45-43 lead. David West got tangled up with Irving while fighting for the ball with 3:08 left before halftime; after J.R. Smith pushed West from behind, Tristan Thompson entered the tussle and went face-to-face with West while each jawed at one another. West, Thompson and Smith all received technical fouls after the officials reviewed the replay. A 28-4 run pushed Golden State ahead, just after it looked like Durant committed his third foul on a basket by James that was not called. The Cavaliers were barely able to hold on, trailing by 11 at the end of the half. Cleveland responded in the third quarter by outscoring the Warriors 33-27 to cut the lead to five and eventually to as little as three, but could not withstand the offensive barrage by the Warriors in the fourth. Kevin Durant hit a 17-foot fadeaway over James early in the fourth quarter, then assisted on an Andre Iguodala 3-pointer the next possession as the Warriors began to pull away for good.

Kevin Durant, who was defeated in the 2012 NBA Finals when his Oklahoma City Thunder were finished off 4-1 by LeBron James' Miami Heat, returned the favor by scoring a team high 39 points in the 4-1 series defeat of James' Cavaliers while being honored as the 2017 Finals MVP. Stephen Curry added 34 points, 10 assists and six rebounds alongside Draymond Green's 12 big rebounds. Andre Iguodala, the 2015 Finals MVP, showed up big off the bench with 20 points. LeBron James finished with 41 points, 13 rebounds and eight assists and became the first player in NBA history to average a triple-double in the NBA Finals, a feat made all the more impressive with his excellent shooting percentages of 56% from the field and 38% from behind the arc over the 5-game series, with the only blemishes being his poor free-throw shooting and turnover count. Kyrie Irving was the Cavaliers second leading scorer with 26 points on 9 of 22 from the field. However, it was the final game of Irving's career with the Cavaliers before he was traded to the Boston Celtics in the off-season. J. R. Smith scored his 2017 postseason-best 25 points while going 7 of 8 from beyond the arc.

With the win at Oracle, the Warriors became the first Bay Area team to win a championship in their home city since the Oakland A's beat the Los Angeles Dodgers in Game 5 of the 1974 World Series (the San Francisco 49ers won Super Bowl XIX in January 1985 at Stanford Stadium in nearby Stanford and the Oakland Athletics won the 1989 World Series in San Francisco), gaining revenge from their 2016 loss.

Rosters

Golden State Warriors

<noinclude>

Cleveland Cavaliers

<noinclude>

Player statistics

Golden State Warriors

|-
| style="text-align:left;"|  || 4 || 0 || 11.1 || .438 || .273 || 1.000 || 1.0 || 0.8 || 0.3 || 0.0 || 4.8
|-
| style="text-align:left;"|  || 5 || 5 || 37.7 || .440 || .388 || .897 || 8.0 || 9.4 || 2.2 || 0.0 || 26.8
|-! style="background:#FDE910;"
| style="text-align:left;"|  || 5 || 5 || 39.7 || .556 || .474 || .927 || 8.4 || 5.4 || 1.0 || 1.6 || 35.2
|-
| style="text-align:left;"|  || 5 || 5 || 35.4 || .345 || .280 || .667 || 10.2 || 4.8 || 1.6 || 0.6 || 11.0
|-
| style="text-align:left;"|  || 5 || 0 || 28.2 || .529 || .333 || .333 || 3.2 || 3.4 || 1.2 || 1.0 || 8.6
|-
| style="text-align:left;"|  || 5 || 0 || 15.0 || .536 || .000 || 1.000 || 1.0 || 1.2 || 0.2 || 0.0 || 6.6
|-
| style="text-align:left;"|  || 4 || 0 || 2.8 || .667 || .000 || .000 || 0.5 || 0.0 || 0.3 || 0.0 || 1.0
|-
| style="text-align:left;"|  || 5 || 0 || 6.8 || .273 || .200 || 1.000 || 2.0 || 0.4 || 0.2 || 0.0 || 2.2
|-
| style="text-align:left;"|  || 4 || 0 || 5.6 || .667 || .000 || .750 || 2.5 || 0.8 || 0.0 || 0.5 || 2.8
|-
| style="text-align:left;"|  || 5 || 5 || 13.2 || .538 || .000 || .400 || 2.8 || 0.4 || 0.4 || 0.0 || 3.2
|-
| style="text-align:left;"|  || 5 || 5 || 36.5 || .429 || .425 || .714 || 4.8 || 2.2 || 0.4 || 0.2 || 16.4
|-
| style="text-align:left;"|  || 5 || 0 || 10.0 || .588 || .000 || .500 || 2.0 || 0.6 || 0.0 || 0.6 || 4.2
|-
| style="text-align:left;"|  || 5 || 0 || 1.8 || .333 || .500 || .000 || 0.2 || 0.4 || 0.0 || 0.0 || 0.6

Cleveland Cavaliers

|-
| style="text-align:left;"|  || 1 || 0 || 11.2 || .200 || .000 || .000 || 3.0 || 1.0 || 0.0 || 0.0 || 2.0
|-
| style="text-align:left;"|  || 5 || 5 || 40.3 || .472 || .419 || .900 || 4.0 || 4.4 || 1.0 || 0.2 || 29.4
|-
| style="text-align:left;"|  || 5 || 5 || 42.4 || .564 || .387 || .649 || 12.0 || 10.0 || 1.4 || 1.0 || 33.6
|-
| style="text-align:left;"|  || 5 || 0 || 16.6 || .444 || .111 || .667 || 2.4 || 0.4 || 0.2 || 0.2 || 5.8
|-
| style="text-align:left;"|  || 3 || 0 || 3.5 || .667 || .500 || 1.000 || 1.3 || 0.0 || 0.0 || 0.0 || 3.0
|-
| style="text-align:left;"|  || 3 || 0 || 2.8 || .000 || .000 || .000 || 0.3 || 0.0 || 0.0 || 0.0 || 0.0
|-
| style="text-align:left;"|  || 5 || 0 || 19.3 || .368 || .313 || 1.000 || 1.2 || 0.4 || 0.2 || 0.2 || 4.4
|-
| style="text-align:left;"|  || 5 || 5 || 32.2 || .388 || .387 || .800 || 11.2 || 1.0 || 2.2 || 1.0 || 16.0
|-
| style="text-align:left;"|  || 5 || 0 || 13.3 || .235 || .222 || .800 || 1.6 || 0.4 || 0.6 || 0.4 || 3.6
|-
| style="text-align:left;"|  || 5 || 5 || 29.2 || .541 || .581 || .333 || 1.3 || 0.3 || 0.8 || 0.0 || 11.8
|-
| style="text-align:left;"|  || 5 || 5 || 26.4 || .545 || .000 || .667 || 5.8 || 2.6 || 0.6 || 0.6 || 5.6
|-
| style="text-align:left;"|  || 5 || 0 || 12.2 || .125 || .111 || .000 || 1.6 || 1.2 || 0.4 || 0.0 || 1.0
|-
| style="text-align:left;"|  || 3 || 0 || 3.4 || .333 || .500 || 1.000 || 0.3 || 0.3 || 0.0 || 0.0 || 2.3

Media coverage
In the United States, the NBA Finals aired on ABC with Mike Breen as play-by-play commentator, and Jeff Van Gundy and Mark Jackson serving as color commentators. ESPN Radio aired it as well and had Marc Kestecher and Hubie Brown as commentators. ESPN Deportes provided exclusive Spanish-language coverage of The Finals, with a commentary team of Álvaro Martín and Carlos Morales.

See also

 Death Lineup
 Cavaliers–Warriors rivalry

References

External links
 Official website
 2017 NBA Finals at Basketball-Reference.com

Finals
National Basketball Association Finals
NBA
NBA
NBA Finals
NBA Finals
2010s in Cleveland
2010s in Oakland, California
NBA Finals
Basketball competitions in Oakland, California
Basketball competitions in Cleveland
ABS-CBN television specials